The demography of Greater Manchester is analysed by the Office for National Statistics and data is produced for each of its ten metropolitan boroughs, each of the Greater Manchester electoral wards, the NUTS3 statistical sub-regions, each of the Parliamentary constituencies in Greater Manchester, the 15 civil parishes in Greater Manchester, and for all of Greater Manchester as a whole; the latter of which had a population of 2,682,500 at the 2011 UK census. Additionally, data is produced for the Greater Manchester Urban Area. Statistical information is produced about the size and geographical breakdown of the population, the number of people entering and leaving country and the number of people in each demographic subgroup.

Key statistics

Compared against the demography of England, Greater Manchester's demographics are broadly inline with national averages on many topics. In terms of ethnicity, its Asian and British Asian population is considerably above the regional and national averages, as is the portion of residents who identify as Muslim. Compared against the demography of the United Kingdom, Greater Manchester's ethnic minority population consists of 11.09% of the total population. NB. Information in the table on the right is from the 2001 census and not the most recent 2011 census.

As of 2020, the ONS estimates the population of the Greater Manchester Metropolitan County to be 2,835,686.

Population change

The following is a table outlining population totals of the area for every ten years since 1801, using material from the census in the United Kingdom via the Great Britain Historical GIS; pre-1974 statistics were gathered from local government areas that now comprise Greater Manchester. The total population of Greater Manchester is predicted to grow to around 2,950,000 by 2031, with the City of Manchester alone accounting for 36% of the growth.

Boroughs

According to the 2011 census, of Greater Manchester's ten metropolitan boroughs, the City of Manchester is the most populous with a population of 503,127, whilst the Metropolitan Borough of Bury is the least populous with 185,100. The City of Manchester's population in 2021 is predicted at 532,200. The city experienced the greatest percentage population growth outside London, with an increase of 19% to over 500,000. Manchester's population is projected to reach 532,200 by 2021, an increase of 5.8% from 2011. This represents a slower rate of growth than the previous decade.

In terms of ethnic composition, the City of Manchester has the highest non-white population in Greater Manchester (34th in England), followed by the metropolitan boroughs of Oldham (45th in England), Rochdale (53rd in England), and Trafford (68th in England). Wigan is the least ethnically diverse borough in the county, and 274th in England.

The Metropolitan Borough of Oldham is the borough with the highest proportion of people under fifteen years of age. Almost 12% of people in the Metropolitan Borough of Oldham are of South Asian heritage, the highest proportion of a borough of Greater Manchester.

With greater affluence, a recent trend has seen some of the Pakistani community move out of the inner city into more spacious suburbs. In South Manchester this means that they have been moving from Longsight/Levenshulme to more suburban areas such as Cheadle, Chorlton and Heaton Mersey. The inner city areas that are being left are generally filled with newer immigrants from places like Iran, Afghanistan and Poland.

Ethnicity

The following table shows the ethnic group of respondents in the 1991, 2001 and 2011 censuses in Greater Manchester.

Notes for table above

 New category created for the 2001 census
 New category created for the 2011 census
 In 2001, listed under the 'Other ethnic group' heading.

Languages

The most common main languages spoken in Greater Manchester according to the 2011 census are shown below.

Religion

The following table shows the religion of respondents in the 2001 and 2011 censuses in Greater Manchester.

Eurostat NUTS
In the Eurostat Nomenclature of Territorial Units for Statistics (NUTS), Greater Manchester  is a level-2 NUTS region, coded "UKD3", which is subdivided into the "Greater Manchester South" (UKD31) and "Greater Manchester North" (UKD32) level-3 regions.

Urban and metropolitan area
At the 2001 census, the population of the Greater Manchester Urban Area was 2,240,230. This area does not include some outliers within Greater Manchester, such as Wigan, but does extend into the adjacent counties of Lancashire and Cheshire. The Greater Manchester LUZ is the second most populous within the United Kingdom, behind that of London, and sixteenth most populous within the EU.

See also

Demography of the United Kingdom
Demography of England
Demography of London
Demography of Birmingham
Religion in England
List of English cities by population
List of English districts by population
List of English districts and their ethnic composition
List of English districts by area
List of English districts by population density

Notes

References

Bibliography

 

Geography of Greater Manchester
Greater Manchester
Greater Manchester